Cerro Impacto is a large mineral deposit in the southern Venezuelan state of Amazonas.

References

Thorium
Nuclear fuels
Nuclear materials
Economic geology
Geologic formations of Venezuela
Igneous rocks